Albert Likhanov (13 September 1935 – 25 December 2021) was a Russian writer and politician. A children's writer, he also served in the Congress of People's Deputies of the Soviet Union. 

Likhanov died on 25 December 2021, at the age of 86, from COVID-19.

Filmography
 (1979)
 (1984)
Team 33 (1987)
 (1993)

Awards
Order "For Merit to the Fatherland"
Order of Honour
Order of Friendship
Order of the Red Banner of Labour
Order of the Badge of Honour
Medal "In Commemoration of the 850th Anniversary of Moscow"
Medal "For Labour Valour"
Jubilee Medal "In Commemoration of the 100th Anniversary of the Birth of Vladimir Ilyich Lenin"
Medal "For Construction of the Baikal-Amur Railway"
Medal "Veteran of Labour"
Order of Merit of Ukraine
Order of Francysk Skaryna
Francysk Skaryna Medal
Dostlug Order

Lenin Komsomol Prize
Order of Holy Prince Daniel of Moscow

Works
Лиханов А. А. (1971)
Вальбе Р. Б. (1978)
Скоробогач Т. Л. (1997)
Аннинский Л. (2012)

References

1935 births
2021 deaths
20th-century Russian writers
21st-century Russian writers
Soviet writers
People from Kirov, Kirov Oblast
Communist Party of the Soviet Union members
Recipients of the Order "For Merit to the Fatherland"
Recipients of the Order of Honour (Russia)
Recipients of the Order of the Red Banner of Labour
Chevaliers of the Order of Merit (Ukraine)
Recipients of the Order of Francysk Skaryna
Recipients of the Francysk Skaryna Medal
Recipients of the Lenin Komsomol Prize
Recipients of the Order of Holy Prince Daniel of Moscow
Deaths from the COVID-19 pandemic in Russia